An electric charcoal starter is an electric heating element designed for igniting charcoal without kindling. It may be simply a heater loop that is inserted into a pile of charcoal, or may include a pot for holding the charcoal. Electric starters are "virtually fool-proof", but do require a source of electricity.

See also
 Chimney starter, another charcoal lighting system
 Charcoal lighter fluid

Notes

Tools
Charcoal
Barbecue